Jane Bennett (born July 31, 1957) is an American political theorist and philosopher. She is the Andrew W. Mellon Professor of the Humanities at the Department of Political Science, Johns Hopkins University School of Arts and Sciences. She was also the editor of the academic journal Political Theory between 2012-2017.

Education 
Jane Bennett originally trained in environmental studies and political science. She then went on to Cornell University to study environmental science. After Cornell she studied political theory and gained her degree (magna cum laude) in 1979 from Siena College, Loudonville, New York. Whilst at Siena College Bennett met Kathy Ferguson. Bennett then went on to the University of Massachusetts and qualified as a doctor of political science in 1986.

Philosophical work
Bennett's work considers ontological ideas about the relationship between humans and 'things', what she calls "vital materialism":
What counts as the material of vital materialism? Is it only human labour and the socio-economic entities made by men using raw materials? Or is materiality more potent than that? How can political theory do a better job of recognizing the active participation of nonhuman forces in every event and every stabilization? Is there a form of theory that can acknowledge a certain ‘thing-power’, that is, the irreducibility of objects to the human meanings or agendas they also embody?

In her most frequently cited book, Vibrant Matter: A Political Ecology of Things, Bennett's argument is that, "Edibles, commodities, storms, and metals act as quasi agents, with their own trajectories, potentialities and tendencies.". Bennett has also published books on American authors Henry David Thoreau and Walt Whitman.

Public lectures she has given include "Impersonal Sympathy", a talk theorizing 'sympathy' in which she considered the alchemist-physician Paracelsus (1493-1541) and Walt Whitman's collection of poetry, Leaves of Grass. In 2015 Bennett delivered the annual Neal A. Maxwell Lecture in Political Theory and Contemporary Politics at the University of Utah entitled “Walt Whitman and the Soft Voice of Sympathy.”

Fellowships 
 1997 - Visiting Fellow, Department of Politics, Goucher College, Australian National University
 2007 - Visiting Fellow, Department of Politics, University of Nottingham
 2010 - Fellow, Birkbeck Institute for the Humanities, University of London
 2011 - Fellow, Oxford University, Keble College
 2017 - Fellow, Bauhaus University, Internationales Kolleg fur Kulturtechnikforschung und Medienphilosophie

Bibliography

Books 
 
 
 
 
 Book review: 
 Bennett's response to five book reviews of Vibrant Matter: A Political Ecology of Things:

Edited books

Book chapters 
 
 
 
 
 
 
 
 
 
 
 
 
 
 
Abridged version printed (along with an 'assignment') as:  Open access link.
 
 
 
 
 
 Revised and reprinted as 
 
  - forthcoming.
  - forthcoming.

Journal articles 
  
Also occasionally referred to with the alternative title "The order of nature in Lucretius", this article discusses De rerum natura (On the Nature of Things) by Lucretius.
 
 This article was a response to: 
 
 
 
 
 
  Available via the co-author Alexander Livingston on Academia.edu.
 
 This article was in response to: 
 and: 
 
  
 
 
 
 (Forthcoming)

Blog posts

Published interviews  
 
 Revised and reprinted as 
  Also printed as: 
 
 (Forthcoming)

References

External links 
 Jane Bennett, Johns Hopkins University

1957 births
American political philosophers
21st-century American philosophers
Continental philosophers
Cornell University alumni
Environmental sociologists
Epistemologists
Johns Hopkins University faculty
Living people
Metaphysical realism
Metaphysical theories
Metaphysicians
Ontologists
Philosophers of social science
Political philosophers
Siena College alumni
Social philosophers
Transdisciplinarity
University of Massachusetts Amherst College of Social and Behavioral Sciences alumni